Eremiaphila rohlfsi is a species of praying mantisin the family Eremiaphilidae.

See also
List of mantis genera and species

References

Eremiaphila
Insects described in 1906